Waterloo Library, also known as the Waterloo Library and Historical Society, is a historic library building located at Waterloo in Seneca County, New York. The second story of the two-story frame structure contains a small theater.

It was built in 1883 in the Queen Anne style and is sheathed in brick. The structure is composed of a two-story main block with a three-story projecting pavilion and one-story intersecting gable wing.  It features a number of distinctive Victorian era features such as steeply pitched and intersecting gable roofs; stone elements such as lintels, belt courses, sills, and chimney abutments and caps; and terra cotta wall surfaces and ridge blocks.

It was listed on the National Register of Historic Places in 1996.

References

External links
Waterloo Library & Terwilleger Museum website

Library buildings completed in 1883
Libraries on the National Register of Historic Places in New York (state)
History museums in New York (state)
Queen Anne architecture in New York (state)
Historical society museums in New York (state)
Museums in Seneca County, New York
National Register of Historic Places in Seneca County, New York
1883 establishments in New York (state)
Waterloo, New York